Kirchanschöring is a municipality in the district of Traunstein in Bavaria, Germany. The community is located in the Rupertiwinkel and it borders on the eastern waterside of the Waginger See, although the town itself is some kilometers away from the lake.

History

Kirchanschöring earlier belonged to the prince-bishopric Salzburg.  In 788, Kirchanschöring was first mentioned in a document as a possession of the archbishop Arno.  In that time, it was called Anschering.  This name probably goes back to the name Ansheri or Anskar, relating to a person who settled there.  In the course of the centuries, the name changed into Anschering and later, after the construction of the church in the 14th century, Kirchanschöring.

Economy

The internationally known companies Meindl as well as Royalbeach have their headquarters in Kirchanschöring.  Further main pillars are tourism, trade and agriculture.

Sights
 later gothic catholic church of Kirchstein
 Farming Museum in Hof

References

Traunstein (district)